The 2017 Thailand Champions Cup was the first Thailand Champions Cup, an annual football match contested by the winners of the previous season's Thai League 1 and Thai FA Cup competitions.  The match was played at Supachalasai Stadium, Bangkok and contested by 2016 Thai League T1 champions SCG Muangthong United, and Sukhothai as the champions of the 2016 Thai FA Cup.

Qualified teams

Match

Details

Assistant referees:
 Pattarapong Kusathit
 Rawut Nakarit
Fourth official:
 Chaireag Ngamsom
Match Commissioner:
 Paiboon Uyapo
Referee Assessor:
 Pirom Un-prasert
General Coordinator:
 Ekapol Polnavee

Winner

See also
 2017 Thai League
 2017 Thai League 2
 2017 Thai League 3
 2017 Thai League 4
 2017 Thailand Amateur League
 2017 Thai FA Cup
 2017 Thai League Cup

References

Official news from FA Thailand. SCG Muangthong United VS. Sukhothai.
Official teaser from FA Thailand's Facebook fan page. SCG Muangthong United VS. Sukhothai.
News from SMM Sport. 2017 Thailand champions cup, SCG Muangthong United VS. Sukhothai.
News from Goal.com(Thailand). SCG Muangthong United VS. Sukhothai.
Preview from Goal.com(Thailand). SCG Muangthong United VS. Sukhothai.
Starting lists from Goal.com(Thailand) Facebook fan page. SCG Muangthong United VS. Sukhothai.
Results from Thai League official website . SCG Muangthong United 5–0 Sukhothai.
Highlight SCG Muangthong United 5–0 Sukhothai.

2017 in Thai football cups
Thailand Champions Cup
Thailand Champions Cup
2017